Neoleucinodes dissolvens is a moth in the family Crambidae. It was described by Harrison Gray Dyar Jr. in 1914. It is found in French Guiana, Ecuador, Suriname and Brazil (São Paulo de Olivença, Amazonas).

References

Moths described in 1914
Spilomelinae